Tata is a district in northern part of Komárom-Esztergom County. Tata is also the name of the town where the district seat is found. The district is located in the Central Transdanubia Statistical Region.

Geography 
Tata District borders with the Slovakian region of Nitra to the north, Esztergom District to the east, Tatabánya District and Oroszlány District to the south, Komárom District to the west. The number of the inhabited places in Tata District is 10.

Municipalities 
The district has 1 town and 9 villages.
(ordered by population, as of 1 January 2013)

The bolded municipality is the city.

Demographics

In 2011, it had a population of 38,783 and the population density was 126/km².

Ethnicity
Besides the Hungarian majority, the main minorities are the German (approx. 1,700), Slovak (500) and Roma (250).

Total population (2011 census): 38,783
Ethnic groups (2011 census): Identified themselves: 36,379 persons:
Hungarians: 33,392 (91.79%)
Germans: 1,713 (4.70%)
Slovaks: 447 (1.23%)
Others and indefinable: 827 (2.27%)
Approx. 2,500 persons in Tata District did not declare their ethnic group at the 2011 census.

Religion
Religious adherence in the county according to 2011 census:

Catholic – 13,659 (Roman Catholic – 13,532; Greek Catholic – 121);
Reformed – 6,497;
Evangelical – 424; 
other religions – 433; 
Non-religious – 6,490; 
Atheism – 537;
Undeclared – 10,743.

See also
List of cities and towns in Hungary

References

External links
 Postal codes of the Tata District

Districts in Komárom-Esztergom County